Spurger is an unincorporated community in southeastern Tyler County, Texas, United States.

The Spurger Independent School District serves area students.

Historical development
The first area settlers are known to be in the region as early as 1834. The town's name Spurger comes from a family of landowners who resided there initially. From 1859 a school was established there, and by 1881 a post office was opened.

The Neches River flows through the community.

Climate
The climate in this area is characterized by hot, humid summers and generally mild to cool winters.  According to the Köppen Climate Classification system, Spurger has a humid subtropical climate, abbreviated "Cfa" on climate maps.

Awards and recognition
Starting on September 1, 2017, for a 10-year period, this area is known as the Knife Capitol of Texas.

References

Unincorporated communities in Tyler County, Texas
Unincorporated communities in Texas